Sanjiao is a town in the Meijiang District of Meizhou City, Guangdong Province, southern China.

References 

Towns in Guangdong
Meizhou